The 1938 All-Ireland Senior Hurling Championship Final was the 51st All-Ireland Final and the culmination of the 1938 All-Ireland Senior Hurling Championship, an inter-county hurling tournament for the top teams in Ireland. The match was held at Croke Park, Dublin, on 4 September 1938, between Waterford and Dublin. The Munster champions lost to their Leinster opponents on a score line of 2-5 to 1-6.

Match details

1
All-Ireland Senior Hurling Championship Finals
Dublin county hurling team matches
Waterford county hurling team matches
All-Ireland Senior Hurling Championship Final
All-Ireland Senior Hurling Championship Final, 1938